Johannesburg South is a group of suburbs in the southern part of Johannesburg, South Africa. It is located in Region F of the City of Johannesburg Metropolitan Municipality.

References 

Johannesburg Region F